Computer 2000 was Europe's leading provider of IT products to resellers between 1983 and its merger with Tech Data in 1998.

History
The company was founded in 1983 by German entrepreneur Axel Schultze.  The company had $2.5 Million in sales in 1984, and expanded from Germany into other European countries by creating subsidiaries and acquiring local distributors. In the early 1990s, Computer 2000 expanded into Latin America, the Middle East, and Africa. Within 15 years, the company grew to 2,500 employees and roughly $5 Billion in sales before merging with US-based Tech Data in July 1998. The companies had similar philosophies and products, but acted in different geographic regions.

Notes

External links and references
Company website
Welt Report
SEC filing
Merger approval by European Commission

Polish site of Computer 2000

Companies based in Munich
Distribution companies of Germany